Erkki Harell (12 March 1930 – 25 March 2014) was a Finnish footballer. He played in eight matches for the Finland national football team in 1957.

References

External links
 

1930 births
2014 deaths
Finnish footballers
Finland international footballers
Place of birth missing
Association footballers not categorized by position